Jeffrey Michael Gray (born November 19, 1981) is an American former professional baseball pitcher. He played in Major League Baseball (MLB) for the Oakland Athletics, Chicago Cubs, Chicago White Sox. Seattle Mariners, and Minnesota Twins. He graduated from Lafayette High School in Wildwood, Missouri and attended Southwest Missouri State University.

Career

Oakland Athletics
Gray was selected by the Oakland Athletics in the 2004 Major League Baseball Draft.

Gray participated in the 2008 Arizona Fall League season as a member of the Phoenix Desert Dogs.

Chicago Cubs
He was traded by the Athletics to the Chicago Cubs on December 3, 2009 for Jake Fox and Aaron Miles.

Chicago White Sox
On November 23, 2010, Gray signed a minor league contract for the Chicago White Sox. He was designated for assignment on May 11, 2011.

Seattle Mariners
On 13 May 2011, he was claimed off waivers by the Seattle Mariners.

Minnesota Twins
On 31 October 2011, he was claimed off waivers by the Minnesota Twins.

Return to White Sox

On 21 December 2012 the Chicago White Sox signed him to a 1-year minor league contract with an invite to spring training.

On 18 July 2013, the White Sox released Gray.

References

External links

1981 births
Living people
American expatriate baseball players in Canada
Arizona League Athletics players
Arizona League Cubs players
Baseball players from Texas
Bristol White Sox players
Charlotte Knights players
Oakland Athletics players
Chicago Cubs players
Chicago White Sox players
Iowa Cubs players
Kane County Cougars players
Major League Baseball pitchers
Midland RockHounds players
Minnesota Twins players
Missouri State Bears baseball players
Sacramento River Cats players
Seattle Mariners players
Stockton Ports players
Vancouver Canadians players